Anotogaster is a genus of dragonflies in the family Cordulegastridae.

The genus contains the following species:
Anotogaster antehumeralis 
Anotogaster basalis 
Anotogaster chaoi 
Anotogaster cornutifrons 
Anotogaster flaveola 
Anotogaster gigantica 
Anotogaster gregoryi 
Anotogaster klossi 
Anotogaster kuchenbeiseri 
Anotogaster myosa 
Anotogaster nipalensis 
Anotogaster sakaii 
Anotogaster sapaensis 
Anotogaster sieboldii  – jumbo dragonfly, Siebold's dragonfly
Anotogaster xanthoptera

References

Cordulegastridae
Anisoptera genera
Taxa named by Edmond de Sélys Longchamps